Joseph "Joe" P. Clancy) is an American law enforcement official. He was the 24th Director of the United States Secret Service. Clancy previously served as head of the agency's presidential protection division until 2011, when he retired and became director of corporate security for Comcast.

Early life and education
Clancy grew up in the Philadelphia area. He graduated from Archbishop Carroll High School in Radnor, Pennsylvania, then attended the United States Military Academy at West Point, where he excelled on West Point's football team. Clancy transferred to Villanova University and graduated in the late 1970s.

Career
After graduating from Villanova, Clancy worked as a history teacher for four years at the former Bishop Kenrick High School in Norristown, Pennsylvania, and then for a year at Father Judge High School in Philadelphia.

Clancy joined the United States Secret Service in Philadelphia in the 1980s. Subsequently, he worked in the New York field office, directing a team of agents that conducted major investigations. He was in charge of security at national special events before joining the president's protective detail.

During his work on the presidential protection details he was able to achieve a close bond with President Barack Obama, and was well regarded by the Obama administration. Clancy was part of the Secret Service protective detail that jogged with President Bill Clinton in the early days of his presidency.

Clancy was appointed as acting director following the resignation of Julia Pierson on October 1, 2014, a position he held until his appointment as director on February 18, 2015 by President Obama.

On February 14, 2017, Clancy announced his retirement, effective March 4, 2017.

References

External links

Directors of the United States Secret Service
Obama administration personnel
United States Secret Service agents
Army Black Knights football players
Comcast people
Villanova University alumni
Living people
People from Elwood, Indiana
Archbishop John Carroll High School alumni
Year of birth missing (living people)